Robert Newton Brezee (1851–1929), usually referred to as R. Newton Brezee or Newton Brezee, was an American architect chiefly active in Saratoga Springs, New York and surrounding areas.

Professional
Brezee came to Saratoga Springs in 1867. He worked as a carpenter, and left Saratoga for a while to work on the planned community of Garden City, Long Island built by Alexander Turney Stewart. A self-taught architect, he returned to Saratoga Springs and opened an office in 1884. He is credited with the design of more than fifty buildings.

Personal
Brezee was born on September 26, 1851 in Middleburgh, New York.
He married Jennie M. Carr (1855-1950) on July 25, 1881 in Saratoga Springs.  
The couple had four daughters: Edna Winford Brezee (1882-1971), Claire M. Brezee (b.1885) (Mrs. Samuel J. Mott), Elizabeth L. Brezee (1887-1989), and Dorothy Newton Brezee (1897-1949).

Brezee died in 1929; he and Jennie are buried in Greenridge Cemetery in Saratoga Springs.

Buildings designed
Brezee designed primarily in the Queen Anne and Colonial Revival styles. Many Brezee-designed buildings have been preserved in the Union Avenue Historic District and the East Side Historic District in Saratoga Springs.  The following is a partial list of these and of his other works:

==References==

Further reading

1851 births
1929 deaths
19th-century American architects
Architects from New York (state)
People from Saratoga Springs, New York
Burials at Greenridge Cemetery
20th-century American architects